Bernhard Kaun (5 April 1899 – 3 January 1980) was an American composer and orchestrator. He is known for the Frankenstein (1931) theme.

Filmography

Platinum Blonde (1931) 
Frankenstein (1931)
What Price Hollywood? (1932)
Doctor X (1932)
The Most Dangerous Game (1932)
Thirteen Women (1932)
A Bill of Divorcement (1932)
I Am a Fugitive from a Chain Gang (1932) 
A Farewell to Arms (1932)
20,000 Years in Sing Sing (1932) 
Frisco Jenny (1932)
Employees' Entrance (1933)
Mystery of the Wax Museum (1933)
King Kong (1933)
I Loved a Woman (1933)
The Kennel Murder Case (1933)
Little Women (1933)
Lady Killer (1933)
Son of Kong (1933)
Flying Down to Rio (1933)
The Lost Patrol (1934)
The Gay Divorcee (1934)
The Little Minister (1934)
The Informer (1935)
Becky Sharp (1935)
She (1935)
The Three Musketeers (1935)
The Last Days of Pompeii (1935) 
Peter Ibbetson (1935) 
The Petrified Forest (1936)
Modern Times (1936)
The Walking Dead (1936)
The Story of Louis Pasteur (1936)
Little Lord Fauntleroy (1936)
Hearts Divided (1936)
China Clipper (1936)
The Garden of Allah (1936)
Black Legion (1937)
Marked Woman (1937)
Lost Horizon (1937)
A Star Is Born (1937) 
Souls at Sea (1937) 
The Adventures of Tom Sawyer (1938) 
The Saint in New York (1938) 
The Return of Doctor X (1939)
Gone with the Wind (1939)
They Died with Their Boots On (1941)
Kings Row (1942)
Mission to Moscow (1943) 
Background to Danger (1943) 
The Adventures of Mark Twain (1944)
Saratoga Trunk (1945)
Tomorrow Is Forever (1946)
Devotion (1946)
The Bravados (1958)
The Fly (1958)

References

External links
 
 
 

1899 births
1980 deaths
American male film score composers
20th-century American male musicians
20th-century American composers
American film score composers
Musicians from Milwaukee